Croatian Internet eXchange (CIX) is the main Croatian Internet exchange point. It is located at the University Computing Center (SRCE) in Zagreb. Although there is no formal obligation to use the exchange, all Croatian ISPs are allowed to do so. CIX uses the BGP protocol to establish peering between ISPs, and a RIPE database for documentation. Switched Ethernet is used for the actual data interchanging.

See also 
 List of Internet exchange points

References

External links 
 CIX official page

Internet exchange points in Europe
Internet in Croatia